Idaga Hamus (also called Edaga Hamus and Sewha Sa'isi'e) is a town in the Saesi Tsaedaemba woreda of Misraqawi Zone of the Tigray Region of Ethiopia. It is located 97 kilometers north of Mekelle on "National Road 1" (now Ethiopian Highway 2), between Freweyni and Adigrat.

Geology and soils 
The following geological formations are present in this locality:
 Adigrat Sandstone
 Enticho Sandstone
The main geomorphic units, with corresponding soil types are:
 Enticho Sandstone plateau
 Associated soil types
 shallow sandy soils with an indurated layer which prevents rooting and drainage (Petric Plinthosol)
 moderately deep, (light) brown, loamy to loamy sandy soil (Chromic Cambisol, Arenic Luvisol, Arenic Lixisol)
 Inclusions
 complex of rock outcrops, very stony and very shallow soils ((Lithic) Leptosol)
 shallow, stony, dark greyish brown clay loams and sandy loams (Eutric Regosol and Cambisol)
 clays of floodplains with very high watertable with moderate to good natural fertility (Eutric Gleysol, Gleyic Cambisol)
 Idaga Hamus highlands
 Associated soil types
 shallow, very stony, silt loamy to loamy soils (Skeletic Cambisol, Leptic Cambisol, Skeletic Regosol)
 shallow, stony, dark greyish brown clay loams and sandy loams (Eutric Regosol and Cambisol)
 sandy clay loams to sands developed on sandy colluvium (Eutric Arenosol, Regosol, Cambisol)
 Inclusions
 complex of rock outcrops, very stony and very shallow soils ((Lithic) Leptosol)
 Deep dark cracking clays with very good natural fertility, waterlogged during the wet season (Chromic Vertisol, Pellic Vertisol)
 moderately deep, brown silty loamy to loamy soils (Eutric Luvisol)

Monuments 
A number of rock-hewn churches have been reported near this town which include: Debre Zakarios Giyorgis and Cherqos, a collapsed one at Dengelat, Guwahigot Yesus and Yohannes. 
The contemporary church of Maryam Techot in this town is located on the top of a stepped Aksumite platform about 2 meters high and with dressed-stone corner blocks. A monolithic pillar and other carved fragments in the area may have been salvaged from the Aksumite structure which originally stood on this platform.

History 
Records at the Nordic Africa Institute website provide details of the primary school in 1968. 

Idaga Hamus sheltered a significant number of refugees during the Eritrean-Ethiopian War of 1998-2000.

During the 2020-2021 Tigray War, attacks were carried out on Idaga Hamus by the joint Ethiopian and Eritrean armies. On 18 December 2020, an EEPA report stated that 37 civilians were killed by Eritrean troops in Mariam Dengelat. This follows further reports of Ethiopian ENDF soldiers shooting at unarmed civilians. On 19 December 2020, killings occurred in Idaga Hamus. Eritrean soldiers killed approximately 150 civilians, including a priest and women seeking refuge in a church, located 4 km to the west of Marieam Dengelat. The town and some rural villages (Maimegelta, Dengelat, Tsa'a and Hangoda) are under the control of Eritrean forces. The military is slaughtering the animals. People are starving to death.

Demographics 
Based on figures from the Central Statistical Agency in 2005, Idaga Hamus has an estimated total population of 8,474 of whom 3,962 are men and 4,512 are women. The 1994 census reported it had a total population of 4,883 of whom 2,110 were males and 2,773 were females. Together with Freweyni, it is one larger settlements in Saesi Tsaedaemba woreda.

Notes 

Populated places in the Tigray Region